Hinkson is a surname. Notable people with the surname include:

Hinkson Creek, in Columbia, Missouri
John B. Hinkson (1840–1901), Mayor of Chester, Pennsylvania
Katharine Tynan Hinkson, (1861–1931), Irish-born writer, known for her novels and poetry
Pamela Hinkson (1900–1982), Anglo-Irish writer, author of the book The Ladies' Road (1932)
Ronald "Boo" Hinkson, Saint Lucian jazz guitarist